Puerta del Campo (also known as the Arco de Santiago) was a city gate in Valladolid, Spain, named after the street that ran through it. Until at least the 18th century, it lent its name to the surrounding area.

History

14th–16th centuries 
The gate dates back to the early 14th century; the first record of its existence comes from the Chronicle of Alfonso XI. The road that ran through it was then divided into two sections: Calle de Santiago (which ran from Plaza Mayor to the junction with Calle de Zúñiga) and Calle del Campo, which ran from that junction to the gate.

Puerta del Campo marked the city's southern limits and served a defensive purpose. It and the Puente Mayor (Main Bridge) were the two main entrances to the city, which was situated along the road to Madrid, giving it an important geographical role. Over time, as buildings went up outside the city walls, the gate lost its function as a barrier and city limit, but retained its historical and decorative significance.

It is likely that the first battlement and turreted gate was maintained until the mid-16th century. At that point, the gate lost its medieval defensive features, perhaps because of urban remodeling or perhaps because of an architectural transformation of the structure itself. A corregidor reported in the second half of the 16th century that there was no longer a tower in the city walls.

In 1565, Queen Elisabeth of Valois passed through Valladolid on her way to France to meet with her mother, Catherine de Medici. In her honor, the city lavishly decorated Puerta del Campo, where official receptions were customarily held. The gate was adorned with artwork by the sculptor Juan de Juni and the painters Benito Rabuyate, Mateo Espinosa and Antonio de Ávila. Their paintings depicted kings and other members of the royal family, as well as mythological themes and allegories. When the queen entered the city on May 3, 1565, according to one report, "the 42 side windows" of the gate "were populated with musicians" who played harps, lyres, flutes and other instruments. Afterward, on May 16, a committee was formed "to make and sell the canvases and remains of the arch of the Puerta del Campo".

More than twenty years later, in 1589, the gate was similarly decorated for a visit by King Philip II. In 1592, before another visit by Philip II—his last to Valladolid—it was repainted and the placards on it replaced.

17th–19th centuries 
Some local historians say that once the gate had ceased to serve as part of the city walls, it was demolished and replaced by the Arco de Santiago, built in 1626 by Francisco de Praves. In May 1628, a committee was formed to repair the arch and turret. These repairs were finished in September of that year. On November 20, de Praves, the regidor of the city, was instructed to look into the cost of commissioning two sculptures to decorate the arch: one depicting Jesus' resurrection and the other the Virgin Mary. There is no evidence that these sculptures were completed, but the record is of interest because it is the only one in which de Praves is associated with the arch. In 1655, it was decided that the arch would be decorated with portraits of Our Lady of Saint Lawrence and the archangel Michael, to be finished in April 1656. These images would become permanent guards and decorations of the arch, first on canvas and later as sculptures. In the decades that followed, portraits of the reigning monarchs were painted on the arch: For example, in 1690, portraits of Charles II and his wife, Maria Anna of Neuburg, were painted, and in 1707, they were replaced by equestrian portraits of Philip V and Maria Luisa of Savoy.

The appearance of the gate in the 18th century is documented in two works by the engraver Diego Pérez Martínez, one from 1759 and the second from 1788. In the first engraving, the arch is ornately decorated with trimmed plates and Baroque reliefs and plasterworks. On the keystone of the arch is a kind of mask, adorned with wreaths. The attic—flanked with balusters, large buttresses and pyramids, and topped with a pediment—houses the sculpture of the archangel Michael. In the second engraving, the decorations are much more severe, with some ornaments in recesses in the first section of the pilasters; however, the garland adorning the keystone is the same. It is not known exactly when the redecoration, which incorporated Neoclassical elements, took place. 

In 1858, in honor of a visit by Isabel II and the royal family, the arch was stuccoed and decorated with shields and inscriptions depicting men of Valladolid and the Spanish monarchs named Alfonso. Isabel II visited again in 1861, and this may have been the last time the arch was decorated for such an event. 

Ultimately, the arch was demolished because of its location just off Calle de Santiago—where traffic had increased significantly, especially after the opening of a railway—and because it and the adjacent walls spanned the entire width of the street. Plans for a new street alignment also contributed to the decision. The first calls for demolition came in early 1864, and the decision was approved in June. Demolition began on August 29, 1864, and was completed on September 14.

The sculptures decorating the arch were commissioned by the city council to the local archbishop, and by him to the parson of Santiago. Nothing is known of what happened to the sculpture of the Virgin Mary, but the sculpture of the archangel Michael was relocated to the church of Santiago's baptistery. In 2013, it was moved to the choir area, where it can be seen from the nave.

See also
List of missing landmarks in Spain

References

Buildings and structures completed in the 14th century
Buildings and structures demolished in 1864
Buildings and structures in Valladolid
City gates in Spain
Demolished buildings and structures in Spain
Former gates
Neoclassical architecture in Castile and León